Erastus Foster Post (July 3, 1859 – March 30, 1937) was an American civil engineer, politician, and banker from New York.

Early life and education 
Post was born on July 3, 1859 in Quogue, New York, the son of farmer and politician George Oliver Post and Harriet Foster.

Post attended the Bridgehampton Academy and Williston Seminary in Easthampton, Massachusetts, graduating from the latter's scientific department in 1880. He then returned to Quogue, where he worked as a surveyor and civil engineer as well as manager of his father's farm. In 1886, he was appointed Commissioner of Highways to fill an unexpired term. He was elected to the office a year later.

Career 
In 1895, Post was elected to the New York State Assembly as a Republican, representing the Suffolk County 1st District. He served in the Assembly in 1896, 1897, and 1898. During World War I, he was chairman of the Eastern Suffolk County draft board.  He was also a trustee of the village of Quogue, a member of the board of education for the Quogue Union Free School District, and a Quogue fire commissioner.

Post was a director of the Southampton Bank since its founding in 1888, treasurer of the Quogue Ice Company since its founding in 1893, and a trustee of the Sag Harbor Savings Bank. He later became president of Seaside Bank and Quantuck Water Works Co., vice-president and director of the Queens, Nassau & Suffolk Realty Co., director and vice-president of the Nassau-Suffolk Bond and Mortgage Guarantee Co., and trustee of the Riverhead Savings Bank and the Suffolk County Mutual Insurance Co. He later became vice-president of the Riverhead Savings Bank, and in 1932 he became the bank president.

Post was a member of the Freemasons, the Royal Arch Masonry, the Shriners, and the American Geographical Society. He was a trustee of the Quogue Presbyterian Church. In 1885, he married Anna Grace Foster of Honesdale, Pennsylvania.

Post died on a train near Richmond, Virginia on March 30, 1937. He was returning home from a fishing trip in Fort Myers, Florida, where he overexerted himself and had a heart attack that lead to his death. He was buried in Riverhead Cemetery in Riverhead.

References

External links 

 The Political Graveyard
https://books.google.com/books?id=mvtEAQAAMAAJ&pg=PA27

1859 births
1937 deaths
People from Quogue, New York
Williston Northampton School alumni
American civil engineers
American surveyors
Politicians from Suffolk County, New York
19th-century American politicians
Republican Party members of the New York State Assembly
American bank presidents
American Freemasons
Presbyterians from New York (state)
Burials in New York (state)